Zeme (also called Empeo, Jeme, Kacha and Zemi) is a Sino-Tibetan language spoken in northeastern India. It is one of the dialects spoken by the Zeme Naga, the other being Mzieme.

Locations
Zeme (dialects: Paren, Njauna) is spoken in:
North Cachar hills district, Assam
Tamenglong district, Manipur
Peren district, Nagaland

References

Languages of Assam
Languages of Manipur
Languages of Nagaland
Languages of Tripura
Zeme languages
Endangered languages of India